Thomas C. Lanier was a wealthy planter and an officer in the Confederate States Army during the American Civil War.

Lanier was born and raised in Pickens County, Alabama. He built a flourishing business, Sipsey Mill. He joined the newly formed Bethesda Presbyterian Church in 1838, along with his wife Sarah D. Lanier.

When the Civil War started, Lanier was elected as captain of the Lane Guards, which became Company B of the 2nd Alabama Infantry. The regiment was organized in Lanier's native Pickens County on February 19, 1861, and his company enrolled in state service on March 18, 1861. Its members were transferred to the Confederate command at Fort Morgan, March 26. Lanier eventually became Colonel of the 42nd Alabama. He was twice wounded and fought in many major campaigns.

Following the war, Colonel Lanier wrote these words:

Lanier moved to Florida following the war and founded Lanier, Florida. He was Master of the Masonic Lodge of Leesburg, Florida in 1870.

References

Year of birth missing
Year of death missing
People from Pickens County, Alabama
Confederate States Army officers
People of Alabama in the American Civil War
American planters